Nazzareno Cipriani (23 October 1843, Rome - 1925, Rome) was an Italian painter and watercolorist; known for his views of Venice and his genre scenes.

Biography 
He was descended from a Venetian family. During his studies, he served an apprenticeship in the workshops of the Neapolitan painter, Achille Vertunni, alongside Pietro Barucci and Pio Joris. After three years, he began an independent career, focusing on historical and Biblical subjects.

He first gained popularity when he made his formal debut with Venetian and Roman landscapes, and genre scenes; very traditional in style and rendered in great detail. In 1870, he exhibited with the "Società degli Amatori e Cultori di Belle Arti" then, in 1873, he presented his depiction of a chicken market at the Vienna World's Fair. During this time, he was influenced by the works of Marià Fortuny and made his color scheme more complex. He also began painting with tempera and watercolors.

This was also a time when Orientalist works were very popular, so he made several trips to North Africa, creating sketches for inspiration. He also opened a studio on the Via Margutta, next door to the Orientalist, Enrico Tarenghi.

He also had a showing at the Exposition Universelle (1878). In 1901 and 1902, he exhibited with the progressive artists' group, . He was also a member of the Accademia di San Luca. For most of his life, he gave private lessons.

Many of his work may be seen at the Galleria Nazionale d'Arte Moderna e Contemporanea.

Sources 
 Gian Francesco Lomonaco, Acquerelli dell'Ottocento, La Società degli Acquarellisti a Roma, Roma, Fratelli Palombi, 1987 
 Renato Mammucari, Acquerellisti romani: suggestioni neoclassiche, esotismo orientale, decadentismo bizantino, realismo borghese, Città di Castello (Perugia), Edimond, 2001

External links 

 More works by Cipriani @ ArtNet

1843 births
1925 deaths
Italian painters
Italian genre painters
Italian watercolourists
Italian orientalists
Painters from Rome